Acacia grisea is a shrub of the genus Acacia and the subgenus Pulchellae that is endemic to an area of south western Australia.

Description
It blooms from June to August and produces yellow flowers. The simple inflorescences occur singly in the axils and have spherical flower-heads containing 16 to 26 golden coloured flowers.

Taxonomy
It is closely related to Acacia browniana which is found closer to the coast.

Distribution
It is native to an area in the Wheatbelt and Great Southern regions of Western Australia where it is commonly situated on slopes and undulating plains growing in gravelly loamy lateritic soils. The range of the plant extends from around Kukerin in the north to around Kojonup in the south west and Brommehill in the south east.

See also
 List of Acacia species

References

grisea
Acacias of Western Australia
Plants described in 1920
Taxa named by Spencer Le Marchant Moore